Sweden International Improv Festival, abbreviated as SWIMP, is an international festival for improvisational theatre.

The festival goes on for four days and fosters workshops and shows by improvisers and instructors from different parts of the world. One of the main ambitions with the festival is to create meaningful artistic exchanges and form relations between artists and visitors from all over the world.

During the first three years of SWIMP improvisational theatre companies and workshop instructors from 17 countries have participated. Some of the countries represented are the United States, Italy, India, Belgium, England, the Netherlands, Scotland and Argentina.

SWIMP is produced and hosted by Teater Prego and Reginateatern.

See also
Improvisational theatre

References

External links

Festivals in Sweden
Spring (season) events in Sweden